The Green-Lovelace House, located about  north of the town of Sicily Island in Catahoula Parish, Louisiana, is a historic house which was built in about 1830.  It was listed on the National Register of Historic Places in 1983.

It has elements of Greek Revival style.

It was one of just three Greek Revival-styled plantation houses surviving in the parish in 1983, out of what was probably about 40 at the time of the American Civil War.

See also
National Register of Historic Places listings in Catahoula Parish, Louisiana
Battleground Plantation, another Greek Revival plantation house in the parish, about two miles north

References

Houses on the National Register of Historic Places in Louisiana
Greek Revival architecture in Louisiana
Houses completed in 1830
Catahoula Parish, Louisiana